Vigethia is a genus of Mexican flowering plants in the tribe Heliantheae within the family Asteraceae.

Species
There is only one known species, Vigethia mexicana, called the Mexican green-eyed sunflower, native to the State of Nuevo León in northern Mexico.

References

External links
Inaturalist Vigethia mexicana, a member of Sunflower Family (Family Asteraceae) 

Monotypic Asteraceae genera
Heliantheae
Flora of Nuevo León